Diana Blanche Barrymore Blythe (March 3, 1921 – January 25, 1960), known professionally as Diana Barrymore, was an American film and stage actress.

Early life
 
Born Diana Blanche Barrymore Blythe in New York, New York, Diana Barrymore was the daughter of actor John Barrymore and his second wife, poet Blanche Oelrichs. 

Her parents divorced when she was four years old. Educated in Paris and New York City, Barrymore had little contact with her father.

Career

While in her teens, Barrymore decided to study acting and enrolled at the American Academy of Dramatic Arts. Because of the prominence of the Barrymore name in the world of theatre, her move onto the stage began with much publicity including a 1939 cover of Life. At age 19, Barrymore made her Broadway debut and the following year made her first appearance in movies with a small role in a Warner Bros. production. In 1942, she signed a contract with Universal Studios who capitalized on her Barrymore name with a major promotional campaign billing her as "1942's Most Sensational New Screen Personality." However, alcohol and drug problems soon emerged and negative publicity from major media sources dampened her prospects. After less than three years in Hollywood, and six significant film roles at Universal, Barrymore's personal problems ended her career.

Her father John died in 1942 from cirrhosis of the liver after years of alcoholism. Diana Barrymore's life became a series of alcohol- and drug-related disasters marked by bouts of severe depression that resulted in several suicide attempts and extended sanitarium stays. She squandered her movie earnings and her inheritance from her father's estate, and when her mother died in 1950, Diana was left with virtually nothing from a once-vast family fortune. In 1949, she was offered her own television talk show titled The Diana Barrymore Show. The show was prepared for broadcast, but Barrymore didn't show up, and the program was immediately canceled. Had she gone through with the show, it would have been the first talk show in television history, predating Joe Franklin by two years. In the early 1950s, she and her third husband toured Australia and upon returning to the United States, she expressed her dislike for the continent.

After three bad marriages to addicted and sometimes abusive men, in 1955 Barrymore had herself hospitalized for nearly a full year of treatment. In 1957, she published her autobiography, Too Much, Too Soon, with help and encouragement from ghostwriter Gerold Frank, which included her portrait painted by Spurgeon Tucker. In July 1957, she promoted the book by appearing on Mike Wallace's TV show The Mike Wallace Interview. Her statements, accessible with online viewing,  included: “At the moment, I don’t drink. I hope to be able, one day, in perhaps the near future [or] the very distant future, to be able to drink like a normal human being. That may never be possible.” 

The following year, Warner Bros. released a movie version of Too Much, Too Soon starring Dorothy Malone as Barrymore and Errol Flynn as her father.  The film was not a success with critics or moviegoers.

Personal life and death
Barrymore was married three times in eight years. Her first was to actor Bramwell Fletcher, who was 17 years her senior and had appeared with her father in his 1931 classic Svengali. Then she married John Howard, a tennis player. Her last marriage was to actor Robert Wilcox. The marriage to Wilcox ended in June 1955 when he died of a heart attack at the age of 45, while traveling by train.

Barrymore died on January 25, 1960, and she is interred in the Woodlawn Cemetery in The Bronx, New York, next to her mother.
Her death has been attributed to a drug overdose, but her autopsy failed to find a cause of death and found no indication of overdose.

See also

List of unsolved deaths

Filmography

Film

Television
 The Diana Barrymore Show (1949) (*cancelled as she didn't show up)
 The Ed Sullivan Show (1950?)
 The Mike Wallace Interview (1957)
 New York Noir: Entertainment Press Conference (1957)
 The Ben Hecht Show (1958)
 Irv Kupcinet Show (1959)

Bibliography
Too Much, Too Soon, with Gerold Frank. New York: Henry Holt and Company (1957)

References

External links

 
 
 Diana Barrymore papers, 1865-1959 (bulk 1937-1957), held by the Billy Rose Theatre Division, New York Public Library for the Performing Arts
 allmovie bio
  interviewed  on television by Mike Wallace on July 14, 1957 (alternate video link)
 Diana wearing shades after being beaten by guy
 Diana as an infant portrait with her father(Wayback Machine)
 with her father on his 60th birthday, February 1942
 Blanche Oelrichs and daughter Diana on the RMS Berengaria

1921 births
1960 deaths
1960 suicides
20th-century American actresses
Actresses from New York City
Alcohol-related deaths in New York (state)
American Academy of Dramatic Arts alumni
American film actresses
20th-century American memoirists
American stage actresses
Television personalities from New York City
American women television personalities
American women memoirists
Diana Barrymore
Burials at Woodlawn Cemetery (Bronx, New York)
Drug-related deaths in New York City
Oelrichs family
Unsolved deaths in the United States
American expatriates in France